Sherin Ahmed is a Bangladeshi politician who is elected as Member of 11th Jatiya Sangsad of Reserved Seats for Women. She is a politician of Bangladesh Awami League. She retired from government service. She was married to the renowned politician Bazlur Rahman, who had been a close associate of Bangabandhu Sheikh Mujibur Rahman and Political Liaison officer to Honorable Prime Minister Sheikh Hasina.

Political life 
She had been actively participating in political activities of Bangladesh Awami League and she also currently in charge of Bangabndhu Soinik League, which was founded by her late husband Bazlur Rahman. She said in a meeting recently that, "Bangladesh will be free from stigma if Bangabandhu's killers are tried".

More info 
 Bangladeshi General Election of 2018;
 11th Jatiya Sangsad members

References

Living people
Awami League politicians
People from Dhaka District
11th Jatiya Sangsad members
Women members of the Jatiya Sangsad
1956 births
21st-century Bangladeshi women politicians